Kevin O'Sullivan (born  1960) is an Irish journalist. He was the editor of The Irish Times newspaper from 2011 to 2017. He was the thirteenth editor of the paper, succeeding Geraldine Kennedy on 23 June 2011, and succeeded in turn by Paul O'Neill on 5 April 2017. Today he works for Talk TV as a broadcaster who specialises in the style of shock jock presenting

Early life and education
O'Sullivan comes from Tramore, County Waterford.  He holds a BSc from University College Dublin, having graduated in 1981, and earned a Diploma in Journalism from Dublin City University in 1983.

Career
O'Sullivan worked for the Connacht Tribune and the Tuam Herald, before moving to the Irish Times in 1997.  At the Times, he worked as a journalist, night editor, an editor for special projects and a health supplement, and the environmental matters and food science correspondent.  He became news editor in 2006.

Personal life
O'Sullivan is married, to Ger O'Sullivan, with three children.

References

1960s births
People from County Waterford
Alumni of University College Dublin
Alumni of Dublin City University
Irish journalists
Connacht Tribune people
The Tuam Herald people
The Irish Times editors
Living people